Follow Your Heart may refer to:

Film and television
 Follow Your Heart (1936 film), directed by Aubrey Scotto
 Follow Your Heart (1990 film), directed by Noel Nosseck
 Follow Your Heart (1996 film), directed by Cristina Comencini
 Follow Your Heart (1998 film), starring Leah Remini
 Follow Your Heart (reality show), a Philippine reality show

Literature
 Follow Your Heart, a novel by Raynetta Mañees
 Follow Your Heart (novel), by Susanna Tamaro

Music 
 Follow Your Heart (Nikki Webster album), 2001
 Follow Your Heart (Carol Banawa album), 2003
 Follow Your Heart (Mario Frangoulis album), 2004
 Follow Your Heart (Cubic Zirconia album), 2011
 "Follow Your Heart" (song), a song by Triumph
 "Follow Your Heart", a song by Scorpions from the 2017 album Born to Touch Your Feelings
 "Follow Your Heart", a song from the 1970 album Joe Farrell Quartet
 "Follow Your Heart", a song from the 1994 film Thumbelina
 "Follow Your Heart", a song by Holly Johnson from the album Europa

Other
 Follow Your Heart (company), vegan food company